1917–1987 is the first studio album by the Leningrad Cowboys, released in 1987.

Track listing

Personnel
Leningrad Cowboys
Pirjo Laine and Nico Ramsden: Guitar on "The Beast in Me"
Mixed by Jari Laaanen, Mark Smith and Nick Tesco

Singles

"L.A. Woman"

7" AMT/ AMTS-107 (Finland)
"L.A. Woman" - 4:54
"Thru the Wire" - 5:23

"In the Ghetto"

12" AMT/ AMTS 12-108 (Finland)
"In the Ghetto" - 4:34
"The Beast in Me" - 7:32

References

1987 albums
Leningrad Cowboys albums